Taru may refer to:

People

Given or middle name
 Taru Kuoppa (born 1983), Finnish competitive archer
 Taru Mäkelä (born 1959), Finnish film director and screenwriter
 Taru Rinne (born 1968), Finnish motorcycle racer
 Bhai Taru Singh (1720–1745), Sikh martyr

Surname
 Eugen Taru (1913–1991), Romanian artist
 Yoshikazu Taru (born 1964), Japanese wrestler

Places
 Taru, Iran, a village in Hormozgan Province, Iran
 Taru Jabba, a village in Pakistan
 An alternative name for the Nyiri Desert

Other uses
 Taru (album), a 1968 Lee Morgan album
 The Technical Assistance Response Unit of the New York City Police Department
 Taru (god), an ancient Anatolian weather god